Trás-os-Montes Province is one of the medieval provinces of Portugal.

The northern part is covered by Terras de Trás-os-Montes and Alto Tâmega, the southern by Douro Subregion.

See also 
 Trás-os-Montes (region)
 Trás-os-Montes e Alto Douro Province

Former provinces of Portugal